is a railway station located in the city of Mishima, Shizuoka Prefecture, Japan operated by the private railroad company Izuhakone Railway.

Lines
Mishima-Tamach Station is served by the Sunzu Line, and is located 2.0 kilometers from the starting point of the line at Mishima Station.

Station layout
The station has an island platform and a side platform serving three tracks, connected by a  level crossing. The station building is staffed.

Platforms

History 
The line was connected to the former Mishima Station (present day Shimo-Togari Station) on June 15 of the same year. On May 25, 1919 the line was electrified. The northern terminus of the line was moved to present-day Mishima Station in 1934. The station was renamed to its present name on February 1, 1956.

Passenger statistics
In fiscal 2017, the station was used by an average of 1368 passengers daily (boarding passengers only).

Surrounding area
Mishima City Hall
Mishima Taisha
Sano Art Museum

See also
 List of Railway Stations in Japan

References

External links

 Official home page

Railway stations in Japan opened in 1898
Railway stations in Shizuoka Prefecture
Izuhakone Sunzu Line
Mishima, Shizuoka